Benson Records was founded by Bob Benson and John T. Benson, who formed the John T. Benson Music Publishing Company in 1902. The record label started out as Heart Warming Records, creating house labels such as Impact Records, Greentree Records, RiverSong, StarSong, Power Discs and Home Sweet Home. In the 1970s, Impact became the top label with artists such as New Dawn, the Imperials, J.D. Sumner & The Stamps Quartet, the Rambos, Dottie Rambo, the Archers, the Bill Gaither Trio, the Speer Family and Sandi Patty (her Impact catalog is owned by Word Records).

History 
In 1980, Paragon Associates formed a partnership with Zondervan to own/operate Benson Records. Paragon Assoc. was founded in 1975, by Bob MacKenzie and Bill Gaither (gospel singer). Paragon sold its interest to Zondervan in 1983, where under the leadership of Bob Jones, Jr. saw the Benson company grow even bigger in the 1980s. Artists included Gold City, The Kingsmen Quartet, DeGarmo & Key, Dallas Holm, and others producing several hits.

In the 1980s, Benson Records continued with success by signing a contract to distribute a new label, founded by Dan R Brock, Eddie DeGarmo, Dana Key and Ron W. Griffin.  Forefront Records was born, and in 1989 Dc Talk was signed. In 1996, Forefront Records was sold to Capitol Christian Music Group  (owned by Universal Music Group, and this acquisition includes the entire DeGarmo & Key catalog). On July 27, 1993, Benson Music Group distributed the christian children's music series Kids Classics with the first six titles including Bible Songs, Action Bible Songs, Sunday School Songs, Songs of Praise, Silly Songs, and Lullabies. In 1994, the name Impact Records was sold to Landmark Distribution. On July 26, 1994, Benson Music Group released two new Kids Classics including Toddler Tunes and Hymns. On November 1, 1994, Kids Classics changed the new name into Cedarmont Kids. In 1995, they acquired Diadem Music Group which included GospelJazz pioneer Ben Tankard's Tribute Records label contracts. These contracts included Tankard, Yolanda Adams, Twinkie Clark and Bob Carlisle. Carlisle is best known for his hit song, "Butterfly Kisses".

Benson Records was sold to Provident/Zomba in 1997, which is now a part of Sony Music Entertainment. The Benson label was reformatted to focus on new artists.  Zomba closed the label in late 2001.

Most recently, the name Heart Warming Records and RiverSong was sold to Homeland Entertainment. Homeland is owned by Bill Traylor and former President of Zondervan, Bob Jones, Jr.

Artists 

 4Him
 Yolanda Adams
 Angelo & Veronica
 The Archers
 Andrus, Blackwood & Co
 Commissioned
 Carman
 Twinkie Clark
 DeGarmo & Key
 East to West
 Bill Gaither Trio
 Glad
 Gold City
 Fred Hammond
 Harvest
 Dallas Holm
 The Imperials
 Kingsmen Quartet
 Oak Ridge Boys
 Sandi Patty
 Pilgrim Jubilees
 Dottie Rambo
 The Rambos
 Songfellows Quartet
 Speer Family
 Billy Sprague
 J.D. Sumner & The Stamps Quartet
 Straight Company
 Michael Sweet
 Three Crosses
 Tourniquet
 Truth
 Hezekiah Walker
 Whisper Loud
 Thomas Whitfield
 J.C. White and the TFT Church Choir

See also 
 List of record labels

External links 
Benson Records website
Provident-Integrity Distribution
Provident Label Group
Southern Gospel History

Resources 
Powell, Mark Allan. The Encyclopedia of Contemporary Christian Music Hendrickson Publishers, August 2002.

References 

American record labels
Gospel music record labels
Sony Music
Record labels established in 1902
Companies based in Nashville, Tennessee
American companies established in 1902
American companies disestablished in 2001
Record labels disestablished in 2001